Pantanella is a zone of ,  of the  of Corciano in the Province of Perugia, Umbria, central Italy. It stands at an elevation of 232 metres above sea level. At the time of the Istat census of 2001 Castelvieto had 269 inhabitants.

References 

Frazioni of Corciano